Olivier Pla (born 22 October 1981) is a French racing driver currently competing in the FIA World Endurance Championship for Glickenhaus Racing. His younger brother Jim is also a racing driver

Career

French Formula Campus and Formula Three
Born in Toulouse, Pla started his career in 2000 in French Formula Campus before moving on to French Formula Three Championship in 2001 with the Saulnier Racing team. He finished eighth in the series standings, taking nine points-scoring positions in eleven races, including a podium in the penultimate race of the season at Magny-Cours.

In 2002, Pla stayed in the series but switched to the ASM team. He finished third, behind Renaud Derlot and Tristan Gommendy, taking nine podium places from fourteen races, including wins at Croix-en-Ternois and Bugatti Circuit.

In 2003, Pla joined the Formula 3 Euro Series with ASM. He finished third, behind Christian Klien and Ryan Briscoe, taking nine podium places from twenty races.

World Series by Nissan
2004 saw Pla leave the Euroseries, joining the World Series by Nissan. He contested two rounds with RC Motorsport before joining Carlin Motorsport to replace Michael Keohane. He finished ninth, taking thirteen points-scoring positions in eighteen races, including a win at Estoril.

GP2 Series
In 2005 he raced in the inaugural GP2 Series season for David Price Racing. In the early part of the season he stalled on the grid several times — some blamed the GP2 cars for the high number of stallings, while others noticed that the same drivers seemed to be affected regularly. In another race his team mate selected reverse instead of first gear and went backwards into Pla's car. However, he took advantage of the reverse grid system to finish eighth in Race One and thus take pole for Race Two twice (at Hockenheim and Silverstone), winning both those races to finish 11th in the championship. He remained with DPR for 2006, but was dropped mid-season after running out of sponsorship, after a difficult period which saw him score no points and injure his hand in Monaco.

In 2007, he competed in the German Porsche Carrera Cup.  However, he was recalled to DPR in the latter stages of the GP2 season to replace the injured Christian Bakkerud. In 2008, he moved to sports car racing, driving a Lola Le Mans Prototype in the Le Mans Series and 24 Hours of Le Mans.

WeatherTech SportsCar Championship
Pla joined Mazda Motorsports for part of the 2020 WeatherTech SportsCar Championship campaign and signed with Meyer Shank Racing for a full DPi season in 2021.

Racing record

Career summary

* Season still in progress.

Complete GP2 Series results
(key) (Races in bold indicate pole position) (Races in italics indicate fastest lap)

Complete 24 Hours of Le Mans results

Complete FIA World Endurance Championship results

Complete IMSA SportsCar Championship results
(key) (Races in bold indicate pole position; races in italics indicate fastest lap.)

References

External links

 
 

GP2 Series drivers
Formula 3 Euro Series drivers
French Formula Three Championship drivers
French racing drivers
1981 births
Living people
24 Hours of Le Mans drivers
American Le Mans Series drivers
European Le Mans Series drivers
FIA World Endurance Championship drivers
Blancpain Endurance Series drivers
24 Hours of Daytona drivers
WeatherTech SportsCar Championship drivers
24 Hours of Spa drivers
Carlin racing drivers
ART Grand Prix drivers
OAK Racing drivers
RC Motorsport drivers
David Price Racing drivers
G-Drive Racing drivers
TDS Racing drivers
Nismo drivers
Chip Ganassi Racing drivers
Meyer Shank Racing drivers
Racing Engineering drivers
Extreme Speed Motorsports drivers
Action Express Racing drivers
Team Joest drivers
Multimatic Motorsports drivers
Formule Campus Renault Elf drivers
McLaren Racing drivers
Porsche Carrera Cup Germany drivers